

Karl Rhein (30 March 1894 – 27 March 1988) was a German general (Generalleutnant) in the Wehrmacht during World War II. He was a recipient of the Knight's Cross of the Iron Cross of Nazi Germany.

Awards 

 Knight's Cross of the Iron Cross on 6 March 1942 as Oberst and commander of Infanterie-Regiment 439

References

Citations

Bibliography

 
 

1894 births
1988 deaths
Lieutenant generals of the German Army (Wehrmacht)
People from Wetzlar
German Army personnel of World War I
Recipients of the clasp to the Iron Cross, 1st class
Recipients of the Gold German Cross
Recipients of the Knight's Cross of the Iron Cross
People from the Rhine Province
Reichswehr personnel
Prussian Army personnel
People from Hesse-Nassau
Military personnel from Hesse
German Army generals of World War II